De Vlijt  is a windmill located on the Harnjesweg 54 in Wageningen, Netherlands. Built in 1879 it has been in use ever since as a gristmill. The mill was built as a Smock mill and its four sails have a span of 22.30 meters. The mill was bought by the local government and restored in 1978, and it was listed as a national heritage site (nr 38212) in 1970.

Gallery of images

References

External links 
 
 Official website

Buildings and structures completed in 1879
Grinding mills in the Netherlands
Rijksmonuments in Gelderland
Windmills in Gelderland
Windmills completed in 1879
Smock mills in the Netherlands
1879 establishments in the Netherlands
Wageningen
19th-century architecture in the Netherlands